The 1982 season was the 100th season in Philadelphia Phillies franchise history. During the season, Steve Carlton would be the last pitcher to win at least 20 games in one season for the Phillies in the 20th century. He would also become the first pitcher to win four Cy Young Awards in a career.  The 1982 Phillies finished the season with an 89–73 record, placing them in second place in the NL East, three games behind the World Series Champion St. Louis Cardinals.

Offseason 
 December 6, 1981: Bob Boone was purchased from the Phillies by the California Angels.
 December 8, 1981: Dickie Noles, Dan Larson and Keith Moreland were traded by the Phillies to the Chicago Cubs for Mike Krukow and cash.
 January 27, 1982: Larry Bowa and Ryne Sandberg were traded by the Phillies to the Chicago Cubs for Iván DeJesús.
 February 16, 1982: Bake McBride was traded by the Phillies to the Cleveland Indians for Sid Monge.

Regular season 
 July 19, 1982: Tony Gwynn made his major league debut for the San Diego Padres against the Phillies. In a 7–6 Phillies road victory, Gwynn had four at-bats. Gwynn gets two hits, one run, and one RBI.

Season standings

Record vs. opponents

Notable transactions 
 April 13, 1982: Tim Corcoran was signed as a free agent by the Phillies.
 May 14, 1982: Rowland Office was signed as a free agent by the Phillies.
 June 7, 1982: Bruce Ruffin was drafted by the Phillies in the 31st round of the 1982 Major League Baseball draft, but did not sign.
 June 8, 1982: Del Unser was released by the Phillies.
 June 15, 1982: Dick Davis was traded by the Phillies to the Toronto Blue Jays for Wayne Nordhagen.
 June 15, 1982: Wayne Nordhagen was traded by the Phillies to the Pittsburgh Pirates for Bill Robinson.
 August 10, 1982: Willie Montañez was signed as a free agent by the Phillies.
 August 21, 1982: Sparky Lyle was purchased from the Phillies by the Chicago White Sox.
 September 12, 1982: Jerry Reed, Wil Culmer, and Roy Smith were traded by the Phillies to the Cleveland Indians for John Denny.

1982 Game Log

|- style="background:#bbb"
| – || April 5 || Mets || colspan=6 | Postponed (rain); Makeup: June 26 as a traditional double-header
|- style="background:#bbb"
| – || April 7 || Mets || colspan=6 | Postponed (rain); Makeup: June 25 as a traditional double-header
|- style="background:#fbb"
| 1 || April 8 || Mets || 2–7 || Randy Jones (1–0) || Steve Carlton (0–1) || None || 15,345 || 0–1
|- style="background:#fbb"
| 2 || April 9 || Expos || 0–2 || Steve Rogers (1–0) || Larry Christenson (0–1) || None || 7,795 || 0–2
|- style="background:#fbb"
| 3 || April 10 || Expos || 3–11 || Bill Gullickson (1–0) || Dick Ruthven (0–1) || None || 16,718 || 0–3
|- style="background:#bfb"
| 4 || April 11 || Expos || 1–0 || Mike Krukow (1–0) || Ray Burris (0–1) || None || 15,397 || 1–3
|- style="background:#fbb"
| 5 || April 13 || @ Mets || 2–5 || Randy Jones (2–0) || Steve Carlton (0–2) || Neil Allen (2) || 40,845 || 1–4
|- style="background:#fbb"
| 6 || April 14 || @ Mets || 1–8 || Mike Scott (1–1) || Dick Ruthven (0–2) || None || 13,420 || 1–5
|- style="background:#bfb"
| 7 || April 15 || @ Mets || 8–4 (13) || Warren Brusstar (1–0) || Charlie Puleo (0–1) || None || 14,634 || 2–5
|- style="background:#fbb"
| 8 || April 16 || @ Cardinals || 2–3 || Bob Forsch (2–0) || Mike Krukow (1–1) || Bruce Sutter (3) || 15,003 || 2–6
|- style="background:#fbb"
| 9 || April 17 || @ Cardinals || 0–6 || Joaquín Andújar (2–1) || Steve Carlton (0–3) || None || 17,457 || 2–7
|- style="background:#fbb"
| 10 || April 18 || @ Cardinals || 5–6 (11) || Dave LaPoint (1–0) || Warren Brusstar (1–1) || None || 25,222 || 2–8
|- style="background:#bfb"
| 11 || April 19 || @ Expos || 2–0 || Larry Christenson (1–1) || Scott Sanderson (1–1) || Ed Farmer (1) || 10,102 || 3–8
|- style="background:#bbb"
| – || April 20 || @ Expos || colspan=6 | Postponed (rain); Makeup: August 12 as a traditional double-header
|- style="background:#fbb"
| 12 || April 21 || @ Expos || 2–5 || Steve Rogers (2–1) || Steve Carlton (0–4) || Jeff Reardon (2) || 6,448 || 3–9
|- style="background:#fbb"
| 13 || April 23 || Cardinals || 2–9 || Bob Forsch (3–0) || Mike Krukow (1–2) || None || 26,617 || 3–10
|- style="background:#fbb"
| 14 || April 24 || Cardinals || 4–7 || Doug Bair (1–0) || Ed Farmer (0–1) || Bruce Sutter (6) || 25,270 || 3–11
|- style="background:#bfb"
| 15 || April 25 || Cardinals || 8–4 || Steve Carlton (1–4) || Andy Rincon (1–1) || Ed Farmer (2) || 30,198 || 4–11
|- style="background:#fbb"
| 16 || April 27 || @ Dodgers || 0–3 || Jerry Reuss (2–1) || Larry Christenson (1–2) || None || 37,888 || 4–12
|- style="background:#bfb"
| 17 || April 28 || @ Dodgers || 9–3 || Ed Farmer (1–1) || Steve Howe (1–1) || None || 38,665 || 5–12
|- style="background:#fbb"
| 18 || April 29 || @ Dodgers || 0–4 || Burt Hooton (1–1) || Dick Ruthven (0–3) || None || 36,198 || 5–13
|- style="background:#bfb"
| 19 || April 30 || @ Padres || 3–1 (10) || Steve Carlton (2–4) || Juan Eichelberger (2–3) || None || 23,383 || 6–13
|-

|- style="background:#fbb"
| 20 || May 1 || @ Padres || 6–9 || Luis DeLeón (2–0) || Larry Christenson (1–3) || None || 39,785 || 6–14
|- style="background:#bfb"
| 21 || May 2 || @ Padres || 3–0 || Mike Krukow (2–2) || John Curtis (2–1) || None || 44,227 || 7–14
|- style="background:#bfb"
| 22 || May 3 || @ Giants || 5–3 || Sid Monge (1–0) || Dan Schatzeder (0–4) || Ed Farmer (3) || 12,022 || 8–14
|- style="background:#bfb"
| 23 || May 4 || @ Giants || 9–4 || Steve Carlton (3–4) || Rich Gale (1–2) || None || 5,656 || 9–14
|- style="background:#bfb"
| 24 || May 6 || Padres || 12–7 || Larry Christenson (2–3) || Juan Eichelberger (2–4) || None || 21,248 || 10–14
|- style="background:#bfb"
| 25 || May 7 || Padres || 5–2 || Sparky Lyle (1–0) || Gary Lucas (0–2) || None || 26,113 || 11–14
|- style="background:#bfb"
| 26 || May 8 || Padres || 5–1 || Dick Ruthven (1–3) || John Montefusco (1–4) || None || 24,270 || 12–14
|- style="background:#fbb"
| 27 || May 9 || Padres || 0–6 || Tim Lollar (4–0) || Steve Carlton (3–5) || None || 36,593 || 12–15
|- style="background:#bfb"
| 28 || May 10 || Dodgers || 9–8 (10) || Warren Brusstar (2–1) || Tom Niedenfuer (0–1) || None || 25,269 || 13–15
|- style="background:#bfb"
| 29 || May 11 || Dodgers || 9–8 || Porfi Altamirano (1–0) || Jerry Reuss (4–2) || Warren Brusstar (1) || 25,269 || 14–15
|- style="background:#bfb"
| 30 || May 12 || Dodgers || 11–3 || Ron Reed (1–0) || Bob Welch (4–2) || None || 25,977 || 15–15
|- style="background:#bfb"
| 31 || May 13 || Giants || 8–1 || Dick Ruthven (2–3) || Alan Fowlkes (3–2) || None || 23,053 || 16–15
|- style="background:#bfb"
| 32 || May 14 || Giants || 2–0 || Steve Carlton (4–5) || Rich Gale (1–3) || None || 33,541 || 17–15
|- style="background:#bfb"
| 33 || May 15 || Giants || 5–3 || Larry Christenson (3–3) || Greg Minton (2–3) || Sparky Lyle (1) || 29,785 || 18–15
|- style="background:#bfb"
| 34 || May 16 || Giants || 6–1 || Mike Krukow (3–2) || Atlee Hammaker (2–1) || None || 38,125 || 19–15
|- style="background:#fbb"
| 35 || May 17 || Astros || 1–8 || Vern Ruhle (2–2) || Ron Reed (1–1) || None || 23,734 || 19–16
|- style="background:#fbb"
| 36 || May 18 || Astros || 1–2 (12) || Dave Smith (1–2) || Ed Farmer (1–2) || None || 23,869 || 19–17
|- style="background:#fbb"
| 37 || May 19 || Astros || 3–5 || Bob Knepper (2–4) || Steve Carlton (4–6) || Dave Smith (6) || 20,007 || 19–18
|- style="background:#fbb"
| 38 || May 21 || @ Braves || 6–7 || Steve Bedrosian (3–0) || Sparky Lyle (1–1) || None || 28,050 || 19–19
|- style="background:#bfb"
| 39 || May 22 || @ Braves || 5–2 || Mike Krukow (4–2) || Larry McWilliams (2–2) || Ed Farmer (4) || 25,925 || 20–19
|- style="background:#bfb"
| 40 || May 23 || @ Braves || 2–1 || Dick Ruthven (3–3) || Phil Niekro (2–1) || Ed Farmer (5) || 27,965 || 21–19
|- style="background:#bfb"
| 41 || May 24 || @ Reds || 9–1 || Steve Carlton (5–6) || Tom Seaver (1–6) || None || 17,110 || 22–19
|- style="background:#fbb"
| 42 || May 25 || @ Reds || 3–4 || Greg A. Harris (1–0) || Ed Farmer (1–3) || Tom Hume (9) || 16,688 || 22–20
|- style="background:#fbb"
| 43 || May 26 || @ Reds || 0–2 || Mario Soto (4–4) || Mike Krukow (4–3) || None || 14,091 || 22–21
|- style="background:#bbb"
| – || May 28 || Braves || colspan=6 | Postponed (rain); Makeup: August 30 as a traditional double-header
|- style="background:#bfb"
| 44 || May 29 || Braves || 1–0 || Dick Ruthven (4–3) || Phil Niekro (2–2) || None || 26,790 || 23–21
|- style="background:#bfb"
| 45 || May 30 || Braves || 6–2 || Steve Carlton (6–6) || Rick Mahler (4–4) || None || 35,662 || 24–21
|- style="background:#bfb"
| 46 || May 31 || Reds || 5–4 (15) || Sid Monge (2–0) || Bob Shirley (2–3) || None || 22,708 || 25–21
|-

|- style="background:#fbb"
| 47 || June 1 || Reds || 1–4 (7) || Greg A. Harris (2–0) || Mike Krukow (4–4) || None || 20,102 || 25–22
|- style="background:#bfb"
| 48 || June 2 || Reds || 4–2 || Dick Ruthven (5–3) || Bruce Berenyi (4–5) || Warren Brusstar (2) || 22,960 || 26–22
|- style="background:#fbb"
| 49 || June 4 || @ Astros || 3–8 || Vern Ruhle (3–3) || Ed Farmer (1–4) || None || 23,362 || 26–23
|- style="background:#bfb"
| 50 || June 5 || @ Astros || 5–3 || Sparky Lyle (2–1) || Dave Smith (1–3) || None || 35,315 || 27–23
|- style="background:#fbb"
| 51 || June 6 || @ Astros || 6–7 || Vern Ruhle (4–3) || Warren Brusstar (2–2) || None || 21,374 || 27–24
|- style="background:#bfb"
| 52 || June 7 || Cubs || 7–5 || Sid Monge (3–0) || Lee Smith (1–1) || Ed Farmer (6) || 30,146 || 28–24
|- style="background:#bfb"
| 53 || June 8 || Cubs || 5–2 || Marty Bystrom (1–0) || Tom Filer (0–1) || Sparky Lyle (2) || 30,289 || 29–24
|- style="background:#bfb"
| 54 || June 9 || Cubs || 4–2 || Steve Carlton (7–6) || Ferguson Jenkins (3–8) || None || 31,099 || 30–24
|- style="background:#fbb"
| 55 || June 11 || Pirates || 0–1 || Kent Tekulve (4–2) || Larry Christenson (3–4) || None || 30,870 || 30–25
|- style="background:#fbb"
| 56 || June 12 || Pirates || 2–9 || Manny Sarmiento (2–0) || Mike Krukow (4–5) || None || 28,665 || 30–26
|- style="background:#bbb"
| – || June 13 || Pirates || colspan=6 | Postponed (rain); Makeup: August 9 as a traditional double-header
|- style="background:#fbb"
| 57 || June 14 || @ Cubs || 11–12 || Ferguson Jenkins (4–8) || Steve Carlton (7–7) || None || 10,797 || 30–27
|- style="background:#fbb"
| 58 || June 15 || @ Cubs || 5–8 || Doug Bird (4–6) || Dick Ruthven (5–4) || Mike Proly (1) || 8,639 || 30–28
|- style="background:#fbb"
| 59 || June 16 || @ Cubs || 6–7 (11) || Dick Tidrow (2–1) || Warren Brusstar (2–3) || None || 9,377 || 30–29
|- style="background:#bfb"
| 60 || June 17 || @ Pirates || 4–3 (11) || Ron Reed (2–1) || Rod Scurry (4–4) || None || 9,405 || 31–29
|- style="background:#bfb"
| 61 || June 18 || @ Pirates || 8–3 || Mike Krukow (5–5) || Manny Sarmiento (2–1) || None || 23,320 || 32–29
|- style="background:#bfb"
| 62 || June 19 || @ Pirates || 8–3 || Steve Carlton (8–7) || Don Robinson (6–3) || None || 13,065 || 33–29
|- style="background:#fbb"
| 63 || June 20 || @ Pirates || 1–3 || Kent Tekulve (5–2) || Dick Ruthven (5–5) || None || 25,791 || 33–30
|- style="background:#fbb"
| 64 || June 21 || @ Cardinals || 5–7 || Bruce Sutter (6–5) || Ron Reed (2–2) || None || 19,141 || 33–31
|- style="background:#fbb"
| 65 || June 22 || @ Cardinals || 2–3 || John Stuper (2–0) || Sparky Lyle (2–2) || None || 19,672 || 33–32
|- style="background:#bfb"
| 66 || June 23 || @ Cardinals || 7–1 || Mike Krukow (6–5) || Steve Mura (5–6) || None || 19,882 || 34–32
|- style="background:#bfb"
| 67 || June 24 || @ Cardinals || 10–2 || Steve Carlton (9–7) || Bob Forsch (8–3) || None || 33,032 || 35–32
|- style="background:#bfb"
| 68 || June 25 (1) || Mets || 1–0 || Dick Ruthven (6–5) || Pete Falcone (4–4) || None || see 2nd game || 36–32
|- style="background:#bfb"
| 69 || June 25 (2) || Mets || 5–3 || Ed Farmer (2–4) || Pat Zachry (4–3) || Tug McGraw (1) || 36,775 || 37–32
|- style="background:#bfb"
| 70 || June 26 (1) || Mets || 4–3 || Marty Bystrom (2–0) || Randy Jones (6–7) || None || see 2nd game || 38–32
|- style="background:#bfb"
| 71 || June 26 (2) || Mets || 7–4 || Tug McGraw (1–0) || Neil Allen (2–4) || None || 45,513 || 39–32
|- style="background:#bfb"
| 72 || June 27 || Mets || 8–3 || Mike Krukow (7–5) || Craig Swan (5–3) || None || 43,134 || 40–32
|- style="background:#bfb"
| 73 || June 28 || Cardinals || 1–0 || Steve Carlton (10–7) || Steve Mura (5–7) || None || 34,440 || 41–32
|- style="background:#fbb"
| 74 || June 29 || Cardinals || 3–15 || Joaquín Andújar (7–5) || Dick Ruthven (6–6) || None || 23,850 || 41–33
|- style="background:#bfb"
| 75 || June 30 || Cardinals || 6–3 || Larry Christenson (4–4) || Bob Forsch (8–4) || Tug McGraw (2) || 31,403 || 42–33
|-

|- style="background:#fbb"
| 76 || July 2 || @ Mets || 4–8 || Craig Swan (6–3) || Marty Bystrom (2–1) || Terry Leach (1) || 17,528 || 42–34
|- style="background:#bbb"
| – || July 3 || @ Mets || colspan=6 | Postponed (rain); Makeup: July 4 as a traditional double-header
|- style="background:#bfb"
| 77 || July 4 (1) || @ Mets || 9–7 || Steve Carlton (11–7) || Charlie Puleo (6–5) || None || see 2nd game || 43–34
|- style="background:#bfb"
| 78 || July 4 (2) || @ Mets || 7–2 || Mike Krukow (8–5) || Randy Jones (6–8) || None || 20,897 || 44–34
|- style="background:#fbb"
| 79 || July 5 || Giants || 1–3 || Bill Laskey (7–5) || Dick Ruthven (6–7) || None || 63,501 || 44–35
|- style="background:#bfb"
| 80 || July 6 || Giants || 3–2 || Sparky Lyle (3–2) || Fred Breining (4–2) || Tug McGraw (3) || 22,470 || 45–35
|- style="background:#fbb"
| 81 || July 7 || Padres || 3–5 || Tim Lollar (9–2) || Marty Bystrom (2–2) || Luis DeLeón (7) || 26,695 || 45–36
|- style="background:#fbb"
| 82 || July 8 || Padres || 3–5 || John Montefusco (7–4) || Mike Krukow (8–6) || Eric Show (3) || 24,765 || 45–37
|- style="background:#fbb"
| 83 || July 9 || Dodgers || 4–6 (11) || Dave Stewart (5–4) || Tug McGraw (1–1) || None || 40,037 || 45–38
|- style="background:#bfb"
| 84 || July 10 || Dodgers || 4–2 || Dick Ruthven (7–7) || Bob Welch (9–6) || None || 41,268 || 46–38
|- style="background:#bfb"
| 85 || July 11 || Dodgers || 4–3 || Larry Christenson (5–4) || Fernando Valenzuela (12–7) || Ron Reed (1) || 48,773 || 47–38
|- style="background:#bbcaff;"
| – || July 13 ||colspan="7" |1982 Major League Baseball All-Star Game at Olympic Stadium in Montreal
|- style="background:#bfb"
| 86 || July 15 || @ Giants || 2–1 || Mike Krukow (9–6) || Rich Gale (3–9) || Tug McGraw (4) || 8,004 || 48–38
|- style="background:#bfb"
| 87 || July 16 || @ Giants || 1–0 || Steve Carlton (12–7) || Bill Laskey (7–7) || None || 7,720 || 49–38
|- style="background:#bfb"
| 88 || July 17 || @ Giants || 5–3 (11) || Ron Reed (3–2) || Fred Breining (4–3) || Sid Monge (1) || 30,790 || 50–38
|- style="background:#fbb"
| 89 || July 18 || @ Giants || 3–4 || Atlee Hammaker (7–5) || Larry Christenson (5–5) || None || 15,657 || 50–39
|- style="background:#bfb"
| 90 || July 19 || @ Padres || 7–6 || Sid Monge (4–0) || John Curtis (6–6) || Ron Reed (2) || 33,558 || 51–39
|- style="background:#fbb"
| 91 || July 20 || @ Padres || 0–2 || John Montefusco (8–5) || Steve Carlton (12–8) || Luis DeLeón (9) || 16,020 || 51–40
|- style="background:#bfb"
| 92 || July 21 || @ Padres || 7–1 || Dick Ruthven (8–7) || Tim Lollar (10–4) || None || 16,984 || 52–40
|- style="background:#bfb"
| 93 || July 23 || @ Dodgers || 6–3 || Porfi Altamirano (2–0) || Dave Stewart (5–5) || Ron Reed (3) || 47,684 || 53–40
|- style="background:#fbb"
| 94 || July 24 || @ Dodgers || 2–3 || Bob Welch (10–7) || Marty Bystrom (2–3) || Steve Howe (10) || 49,110 || 53–41
|- style="background:#bfb"
| 95 || July 25 || @ Dodgers || 1–0 || Steve Carlton (13–8) || Jerry Reuss (10–8) || None || 46,623 || 54–41
|- style="background:#fbb"
| 96 || July 27 || @ Pirates || 0–4 || Larry McWilliams (7–4) || Dick Ruthven (8–8) || Rod Scurry (7) || 23,609 || 54–42
|- style="background:#bfb"
| 97 || July 28 || @ Pirates || 4–3 || Larry Christenson (6–5) || Rick Rhoden (6–9) || Ron Reed (4) || 31,867 || 55–42
|- style="background:#bfb"
| 98 || July 29 || Cubs || 3–2 || Mike Krukow (10–6) || Dick Tidrow (4–2) || Ron Reed (5) || 33,724 || 56–42
|- style="background:#bfb"
| 99 || July 30 || Cubs || 3–1 || Steve Carlton (14–8) || Ferguson Jenkins (6–12) || None || 33,165 || 57–42
|- style="background:#bfb"
| 100 || July 31 || Cubs || 2–0 || Marty Bystrom (3–3) || Allen Ripley (3–4) || Porfi Altamirano (1) || 50,203 || 58–42
|-

|- style="background:#fbb"
| 101 || August 1 || Cubs || 2–7 || Dickie Noles (7–9) || Dick Ruthven (8–9) || None || 57,652 || 58–43
|- style="background:#bfb"
| 102 || August 2 || Expos || 2–1 || Larry Christenson (7–5) || Bill Gullickson (8–9) || Tug McGraw (5) || 34,542 || 59–43
|- style="background:#bfb"
| 103 || August 3 || Expos || 3–2 || Mike Krukow (11–6) || David Palmer (5–4) || Ron Reed (6) || 34,306 || 60–43
|- style="background:#bfb"
| 104 || August 4 || Expos || 5–4 || Steve Carlton (15–8) || Scott Sanderson (6–10) || None || 36,814 || 61–43
|- style="background:#fbb"
| 105 || August 5 || Expos || 2–9 || Charlie Lea (8–6) || Marty Bystrom (3–4) || Bryn Smith (2) || 52,327 || 61–44
|- style="background:#fbb"
| 106 || August 6 || @ Cubs || 2–4 || Allen Ripley (4–4) || Dick Ruthven (8–10) || Lee Smith (4) || 17,163 || 61–45
|- style="background:#fbb"
| 107 || August 7 || @ Cubs || 2–3 || Dickie Noles (8–9) || Larry Christenson (7–6) || Lee Smith (5) || 25,871 || 61–46
|- style="background:#fbb"
| 108 || August 8 || @ Cubs || 5–8 || Dick Tidrow (5–2) || Tug McGraw (1–2) || Lee Smith (6) || 28,279 || 61–47
|- style="background:#bfb"
| 109 || August 9 (1) || Pirates || 4–3 || Steve Carlton (16–8) || Kent Tekulve (7–6) || None || see 2nd game || 62–47
|- style="background:#fbb"
| 110 || August 9 (2) || Pirates || 6–9 || Enrique Romo (7–2) || Ron Reed (3–3) || Kent Tekulve (17) || 51,568 || 62–48
|- style="background:#bfb"
| 111 || August 10 || Pirates || 9–5 || Marty Bystrom (4–4) || Manny Sarmiento (5–2) || None || 36,825 || 63–48
|- style="background:#bfb"
| 112 || August 11 || Pirates || 4–1 || Sid Monge (5–0) || Rick Rhoden (6–11) || Ron Reed (7) || 27,202 || 64–48
|- style="background:#fbb"
| 113 || August 12 (1) || @ Expos || 3–6 || Bill Gullickson (9–9) || Larry Christenson (7–7) || Jeff Reardon (18) || see 2nd game || 64–49
|- style="background:#fbb"
| 114 || August 12 (2) || @ Expos || 7–8 || Woodie Fryman (7–2) || Sparky Lyle (3–3) || None || 55,097 || 64–50
|- style="background:#fbb"
| 115 || August 13 || @ Expos || 2–3 || Bryn Smith (1–1) || Mike Krukow (11–7) || Jeff Reardon (19) || 48,237 || 64–51
|- style="background:#bfb"
| 116 || August 14 || @ Expos || 15–11 || Jerry Reed (1–0) || Jeff Reardon (4–2) || None || 50,572 || 65–51
|- style="background:#bfb"
| 117 || August 15 || @ Expos || 3–1 || Marty Bystrom (5–4) || Steve Rogers (14–6) || Ron Reed (8) || 59,094 || 66–51
|- style="background:#fbb"
| 118 || August 17 || @ Astros || 0–2 || Vern Ruhle (7–8) || Larry Christenson (7–8) || None || 19,725 || 66–52
|- style="background:#bfb"
| 119 || August 18 || @ Astros || 5–3 (15) || Tug McGraw (2–2) || Mike LaCoss (4–5) || None || 18,449 || 67–52
|- style="background:#fbb"
| 120 || August 19 || @ Astros || 6–7 (11) || Dave Smith (2–4) || Sid Monge (5–1) || None || 18,797 || 67–53
|- style="background:#bfb"
| 121 || August 20 || @ Reds || 9–2 || Dick Ruthven (9–10) || Greg A. Harris (2–4) || None || 17,638 || 68–53
|- style="background:#fbb"
| 122 || August 21 || @ Reds || 3–10 || Bob Shirley (5–9) || Marty Bystrom (5–5) || None || 24,099 || 68–54
|- style="background:#bfb"
| 123 || August 22 || @ Reds || 8–2 || Larry Christenson (8–8) || Mario Soto (10–9) || None || 21,670 || 69–54
|- style="background:#fbb"
| 124 || August 23 || @ Braves || 3–4 || Rick Camp (9–7) || Ron Reed (3–4) || None || 16,224 || 69–55
|- style="background:#fbb"
| 125 || August 24 || @ Braves || 7–9 || Phil Niekro (12–3) || Steve Carlton (16–9) || Gene Garber (24) || 22,709 || 69–56
|- style="background:#bfb"
| 126 || August 25 || @ Braves || 11–9 (10) || Ron Reed (4–4) || Gene Garber (6–7) || None || 23,955 || 70–56
|- style="background:#fbb"
| 127 || August 27 || Reds || 1–8 || Mario Soto (11–9) || Larry Christenson (8–9) || None || 34,429 || 70–57
|- style="background:#bfb"
| 128 || August 28 || Reds || 7–1 || Mike Krukow (12–7) || Frank Pastore (7–10) || None || 38,333 || 71–57
|- style="background:#bfb"
| 129 || August 29 || Reds || 3–1 || Steve Carlton (17–9) || Bruce Berenyi (8–14) || None || 39,237 || 72–57
|- style="background:#bfb"
| 130 || August 30 (1) || Braves || 6–1 || Dick Ruthven (10–10) || Pascual Pérez (0–3) || None || see 2nd game || 73–57
|- style="background:#fbb"
| 131 || August 30 (2) || Braves || 9–11 (12) || Steve Bedrosian (7–6) || Tug McGraw (2–3) || Donnie Moore (1) || 43,854 || 73–58
|- style="background:#fbb"
| 132 || August 31 || Braves || 0–3 || Tommy Boggs (2–0) || Ed Farmer (2–5) || Gene Garber (26) || 29,380 || 73–59
|-

|- style="background:#fbb"
| 133 || September 1 || Braves || 0–4 || Rick Camp (11–7) || Mike Krukow (12–8) || Gene Garber (27) || 24,788 || 73–60
|- style="background:#bfb"
| 134 || September 3 || Astros || 2–1 || Steve Carlton (18–9) || Joe Niekro (13–10) || None || 28,320 || 74–60
|- style="background:#bfb"
| 135 || September 4 || Astros || 4–2 || Sid Monge (6–1) || Bob Knepper (5–14) || Ron Reed (9) || 35,747 || 75–60
|- style="background:#bfb"
| 136 || September 5 || Astros || 4–3 || Porfi Altamirano (3–0) || Nolan Ryan (14–10) || Ron Reed (10) || 33,983 || 76–60
|- style="background:#fbb"
| 137 || September 6 || @ Cubs || 3–4 || Doug Bird (9–11) || Mike Krukow (12–9) || Lee Smith (12) || 23,510 || 76–61
|- style="background:#bfb"
| 138 || September 7 || @ Cubs || 7–5 || Tug McGraw (3–3) || Bill Campbell (3–5) || None || 7,003 || 77–61
|- style="background:#bfb"
| 139 || September 8 || @ Cubs || 4–3 || Steve Carlton (19–9) || Dick Tidrow (6–3) || Ron Reed (11) || 8,233 || 78–61
|- style="background:#bfb"
| 140 || September 10 || @ Pirates || 7–5 || Dick Ruthven (11–10) || John Candelaria (12–6) || Sid Monge (2) || 15,596 || 79–61
|- style="background:#fbb"
| 141 || September 11 || @ Pirates || 9–10 || Kent Tekulve (11–8) || Ron Reed (4–5) || None || 19,842 || 79–62
|- style="background:#fbb"
| 142 || September 12 || @ Pirates || 2–4 || Rick Rhoden (10–12) || Larry Christenson (8–10) || Kent Tekulve (19) || 19,089 || 79–63
|- style="background:#bfb"
| 143 || September 13 || Cardinals || 2–0 || Steve Carlton (20–9) || Bob Forsch (14–9) || None || 40,109 || 80–63
|- style="background:#fbb"
| 144 || September 14 || Cardinals || 0–2 || John Stuper (7–6) || Mike Krukow (12–10) || Bruce Sutter (32) || 32,854 || 80–64
|- style="background:#fbb"
| 145 || September 15 || Cardinals || 0–8 || Joaquín Andújar (13–10) || John Denny (6–12) || None || 33,337 || 80–65
|- style="background:#fbb"
| 146 || September 17 || Pirates || 2–4 || Rick Rhoden (11–12) || Steve Carlton (20–10) || Kent Tekulve (20) || 37,262 || 80–66
|- style="background:#bfb"
| 147 || September 18 || Pirates || 5–4 || Sid Monge (7–1) || Don Robinson (15–11) || Ron Reed (12) || 31,468 || 81–66
|- style="background:#fbb"
| 148 || September 19 || Pirates || 1–8 || Manny Sarmiento (8–3) || Mike Krukow (12–11) || None || 37,352 || 81–67
|- style="background:#fbb"
| 149 || September 20 || @ Cardinals || 1–4 || Joaquín Andújar (14–10) || John Denny (6–13) || Bruce Sutter (34) || 35,899 || 81–68
|- style="background:#bfb"
| 150 || September 21 || @ Cardinals || 5–2 || Steve Carlton (21–10) || Eric Rasmussen (0–1) || None || 38,942 || 82–68
|- style="background:#fbb"
| 151 || September 22 || @ Expos || 4–11 || Bill Gullickson (12–12) || Dick Ruthven (11–11) || None || 18,123 || 82–69
|- style="background:#bfb"
| 152 || September 23 || @ Expos || 2–0 (11) || Ron Reed (5–5) || Steve Rogers (17–8) || Porfi Altamirano (2) || 14,762 || 83–69
|- style="background:#bfb"
| 153 || September 24 || @ Mets || 2–1 || Mike Krukow (13–11) || Walt Terrell (0–2) || Ron Reed (13) || 7,661 || 84–69
|- style="background:#fbb"
| 154 || September 25 || @ Mets || 1–2 || Craig Swan (11–7) || Steve Carlton (21–11) || None || 8,870 || 84–70
|- style="background:#fbb"
| 155 || September 26 || @ Mets || 4–6 || Charlie Puleo (9–9) || Ed Farmer (2–6) || None || 16,384 || 84–71
|- style="background:#fbb"
| 156 || September 27 || Cubs || 1–8 || Randy Martz (11–10) || Marty Bystrom (5–6) || None || 15,744 || 84–72
|- style="background:#bfb"
| 157 || September 28 || Cubs || 3–2 || Larry Christenson (9–10) || Doug Bird (9–14) || Ron Reed (14) || 14,431 || 85–72
|- style="background:#bfb"
| 158 || September 29 || Expos || 4–0 || Steve Carlton (22–11) || Bryn Smith (2–4) || None || 16,024 || 86–72
|- style="background:#bfb"
| 159 || September 30 || Expos || 5–4 || Porfi Altamirano (4–0) || Jeff Reardon (7–4) || None || 15,439 || 87–72
|-

|- style="background:#fbb"
| 160 || October 1 || Mets || 0–1 (10) || Terry Leach (2–1) || Porfi Altamirano (4–1) || None || 16,072 || 87–73
|- style="background:#bfb"
| 161 || October 2 || Mets || 4–3 || Porfi Altamirano (5–1) || Pat Zachry (6–9) || None || 32,729 || 88–73
|- style="background:#bfb"
| 162 || October 3 || Mets || 4–1 || Steve Carlton (23–11) || Ed Lynch (4–8) || None || 19,383 || 89–73
|-

| style="text-align:left;" |
The August 9 game was suspended in the bottom of the 8th with the score 6–9 and was completed August 10, 1982.

 Roster 

 Player stats 

 Batting 

 Starters by position 
Note: Pos = Position; G = Games played; AB = At bats; H = Hits; Avg. = Batting average; HR = Home runs; RBI = Runs batted in

 Other batters 
Note: G = Games played; AB = At bats; H = Hits; Avg. = Batting average; HR = Home runs; RBI = Runs batted in

 Pitching 

 Starting pitchers 
Note: G = Games pitched; IP = Innings pitched; W = Wins; L = Losses; ERA = Earned run average; SO = Strikeouts

 Other pitchers 
Note: G = Games pitched; IP = Innings pitched; W = Wins; L = Losses; ERA = Earned run average; SO = Strikeouts

 Relief pitchers 
Note: G = Games pitched; W = Wins; L = Losses; SV = Saves; ERA = Earned run average; SO = Strikeouts

 Awards and honors 1982 Major League Baseball All-Star Game'''
 Pete Rose, first base, starter
 Mike Schmidt, third base, starter
 Manny Trillo, second base, starter
 Steve Carlton, reserve

Farm system

Notes

References 
1982 Philadelphia Phillies season at Baseball Reference

Philadelphia Phillies seasons
Philadelphia Phillies Season, 1982
Philadelphia Phillies